Tamara and the Ladybug is a 2016 Mexican drama film directed by Lucía Carreras. It was screened in the Contemporary World Cinema section at the 2016 Toronto International Film Festival.

Cast
 Ángeles Cruz as Tamara
 Gustavo Sánchez Parra as Policía Huicho
 Angelina Peláez as Doña Meche
 Alberto Trujillo as Lalo
 Harold Torres as Paco

References

External links
 

2016 films
2016 drama films
2010s Spanish-language films
Mexican drama films
2010s Mexican films